is a scrolling shooter video game developed by Kaneko and originally published by Hudson Soft in 1990 for the Japanese PC Engine and in 1991 for the North American TurboGrafx-16. It is the sequel to Star Soldier, and part of a vertical-scrolling shooter series by Hudson Soft. According to the company, many people believed Super Star Soldier'''s graphics were the best of any HuCard game. Although the game was popular in Japan, it received less attention from the rest of the world.

The Mobile version of Super Star Soldier was released on September 3, 2007 in Japan. Konami published it for the Virtual Console on Nintendo's Wii system in North America on November 27, 2006, in Japan on December 2, 2006, and in Europe on December 8, 2006. The game has also been released on the Japanese PlayStation Store on August 19, 2009 and on the North American PlayStation Store on June 3, 2011. It was also released on the Windows Store December 20, 2013 and on Wii U Virtual Console on February 26, 2014, the first being released in Japan only while the Wii U Virtual Console version was released on April 6, 2017 in the United States.

Gameplay

The game includes a variety of weapons including flamethrowers, electricity, spread guns and heat-seeking missiles. It consists of eight levels.

Plot
Taking place four years after Star Soldier, the original galactic invaders known as the Star Brain corps have returned from their crushing defeat from the Cesear star fighter and they are now led by the ultimate spaceship, Mother Brain. Earth's only defense lies in the Neo Cesear star fighter to finish what was started.

Reception
On release, Famicom Tsūshin scored the PC Engine version of the game a 33 out of 40. Virtual Console was given scores of 7.5/10 from IGN and 6.2/10 from GameSpot.

Artist Perry "Rozyrg" Sessions cited Super Star Soldier as one of the main influences for Super XYX.

Notes

References

External links
Official website

Super Star Soldier -- Caravan Mode -- Strategy Guide (TurboGrafx-16) at TurboPlay'' Magazine Archives

1990 video games
Mobile games
PlayStation Network games
Scrolling shooters
Single-player video games
Star Soldier
TurboGrafx-16 games
Virtual Console games
Virtual Console games for Wii U
Video games developed in Japan
Video games featuring female protagonists
Windows games